Luis Romo (born 18 August 1944) is an Argentine boxer. He competed in the men's flyweight event at the 1964 Summer Olympics. At the 1964 Summer Olympics, he lost to Darryl Norwood of Australia.

References

1944 births
Living people
Argentine male boxers
Olympic boxers of Argentina
Boxers at the 1964 Summer Olympics
Place of birth missing (living people)
Flyweight boxers